is a 2005 Japanese science fiction film directed by Takahiko Akiyama and starring Masatoshi Nakamura, Kanata Hongo and Mikako Tabe. Its tagline is "Inter Galactic Love".

Overview
A recent accident has left Satoru Iwamoto, an elementary school student, temporarily needing a wheelchair. In addition, the recent loss of his mother has thrown Satoru into a reclusive state, locking himself from the outside world. However, in an effort to help Satoru recover from his injuries, his father, Kaoru, has designed a remote-controlled robot that will go to school in his place and allow him to interact with people and do normal things.

The robot, "piloted" by Satoru from a large control terminal in his room, is nicknamed 'Hinokio' by his classmates. Hinokio is mostly admired by his fellow students, and they together start a generally normal year of school. But the story soon dwells more on Satoru, himself, as he rediscovers love and friendship through classmate Jun Kudo and also his own father.

Cast
 Masatoshi Nakamura - Kaoru Iwamoto 
 Kanata Hongō - Satoru Iwamoto 
 Mikako Tabe - Jun Kudo 
 Maki Horikita - Eriko Akishima 
 Ryoko Kobayashi - Sumire Takasaka 
 Yuta Murakami - Jouichi Hosono 
 Ryo Kato - Kenta Hirari 
 Sachie Hara - Natsuko Fubuki 
 Riho Makise - Yuko Sakagami 
 Mieko Harada - Sayuri Iwamoto

Theme song
Yui - "Tomorrow's Way"

External links
 

2005 films
Robot films
Shochiku films
2005 science fiction films
2000s Japanese films